Symphony No. 1 O Imprevisto (The Unforeseen) is a composition by the Brazilian composer Heitor Villa-Lobos, written in 1916. A performance lasts about twenty-five minutes.

History
Villa-Lobos composed his First Symphony in 1916, to a philosophical argument written by himself under the pseudonym "Epaminondas Villalba Filho". It is the first in a cycle of five symphonies written in the style of Vincent d'Indy. It was given a partial performance (the second and third movements, according to some sources; the first and fourth movements according to another) on 20 September 1919 in the Theatro Municipal in Rio de Janeiro by the Grande Companhia Italiana, conducted by Gino Marinuzzi. The complete symphony was first performed on 30 August 1920, again in the Theatro Municipal, by the Orquestra da Sociedade de Concertos Sinfônicos do Rio de Janeiro, conducted by the composer. At some later date, Villa-Lobos revised the score, adding tam-tam, glockenspiel, and side drum to the percussion section

Villa-Lobos had written the romantic-symbolic program text for this symphony already in 1907. It concerns the mystic relationship of the artist's soul with fate and the universe, but these philosophically effusive ideas are both difficult to understand and virtually imperceptible in the music. According to the text, the soul of the artist

Instrumentation
The symphony is scored for a large orchestra consisting of 2 piccolos, 2 flutes, 2 oboes, cor anglais, 2 clarinets, bass clarinet, 2 bassoons, contrabassoon, 4 horns, 4 trumpets, 3 trombones, tuba, timpani, tam-tam, bass drum, cymbals, triangle, side drum, glockenspiel, celesta, 2 harps, and strings.

Analysis
The symphony has four movements:
 Allegro assai moderato
 Adagio
 Scherzo (Allegro vivace)
 Allegro con brio

References

Cited sources

Further reading
 Béhague, Gerard. 1994. Villa-Lobos: The Search for Brazil's Musical Soul. Austin: Institute of Latin American Studies, University of Texas at Austin, 1994. .
 Peppercorn, Lisa M. 1980. "A Villa-Lobos Autograph Letter at the Bibliothèque Nationale (Paris)". Latin American Music Review / Revista de Música Latinoamericana 1, no. 2 (Autumn–Winter): 253–64.
 Salles, Paulo de Tarso. 2009. Villa-Lobos: processos composicionais. Campinas, SP: Editora da Unicamp. .

Symphonies by Heitor Villa-Lobos
1916 compositions